The 2018 Judo Grand Slam was held in Ekaterinburg, Russia, from 17 to 18 March 2018.

Medal summary

Men's events

Women's events

Source Results

Medal table

References

External links
 

2018 IJF World Tour
2018 Judo Grand Slam
Judo